Jørgen Nyland Graabak (born 26 April 1991) is a Norwegian nordic combined skier. With four victories, he has won more Olympic gold medals in the sport than any other athlete.

Biography
He hails from Trondheim and represents the club Byåsen IL.

Career
Graabak has six world cup victories. He competed for Norway at the 2014 Winter Olympics. After not participating in the Normal Hill race, he replaced Mikko Kokslien in the large hill event and won gold, having placed 6th after the jumping stage. In the Men's Nordic combined relay, he won a second gold, racing Norway's final leg.

He was awarded the Holmenkollen Medal in 2022.

Record

Olympic Games

World Championship

References

External links
 
 

1991 births
Living people
People from Melhus
Norwegian male Nordic combined skiers
Olympic Nordic combined skiers of Norway
Nordic combined skiers at the 2014 Winter Olympics
Nordic combined skiers at the 2018 Winter Olympics
Nordic combined skiers at the 2022 Winter Olympics
Olympic gold medalists for Norway
Olympic silver medalists for Norway
Medalists at the 2014 Winter Olympics
Medalists at the 2018 Winter Olympics
Medalists at the 2022 Winter Olympics
Olympic medalists in Nordic combined
FIS Nordic World Ski Championships medalists in Nordic combined
Sportspeople from Trøndelag
21st-century Norwegian people